The queen parrotfish (Scarus vetula) is a species of marine ray-finned fish, a parrotfish, in the family Scaridae. It is found on reefs in the tropical West Atlantic Ocean and the Caribbean Sea. Other common names include blownose, blue chub, blue parrotfish, blueman, joblin crow parrot, moontail, okra peji and slimy head. The young males and adult female queen parrotfish are a reddish-brown color, and quite different in appearance from the bluish-green color of the final phase male. This is a common species throughout its range and the International Union for Conservation of Nature has rated its conservation status as "least concern".

Description
They have two different color phases. Among smaller fish, the sexes are similar but nearly all individuals are female, being reddish-brown or grayish-brown with a paler head and a white lateral stripe low on each flank, and that remains the color scheme for females even when they grow larger. The larger males move on to a new color phase, becoming pale bluish-green, with blue spots near the mouth, yellowish streaks between the mouth and eye, and pale blue bars on the pectoral fins.

Distribution and habitat
The queen parrotfish is native to the tropical West Atlantic Ocean, the Caribbean Sea and the southern Gulf of Mexico.

Ecology
Queen parrotfish is a protogynous hermaphrodite and are often found in small groups of four or five, consisting of one final-phase male and several first-phase individuals, probably females. During courtship, the male constantly circles a female. When she accepts his advances she joins him and they circle together, both simultaneously releasing spawn into the sea. After fertilisation, the eggs hatch and the developing larvae form part of the plankton.

The queen parrotfish feeds primarily on the algal turf it can scrape off surfaces, and coral from coral reefs, but may also eat sponges and other encrusting organisms as it feeds. In the process, it swallows a lot of mineral particles which are deposited on the seabed as fine sand.  It is a diurnal fish, and rests on the seabed or hides in a crevice at night, immersed in a layer of mucus that it exudes and which may help to disguise it from predators. It is preyed on by sharks, groupers and eels.

Parrotfishes are known for the bioerosion that they cause. The stoplight parrotfish (Sparisoma viride) is an "excavator" and degrades the surface of coral colonies, but Scarus vetula is a "scraper", causing erosion of carbonate materials from corals but to a lesser extent than S. viride. Both species have robust jaws with crenelated margins and strong jaw muscles, and large individuals of S. vetula can do considerable damage to corals as they scrape off their food.

References

External links
 

Queen parrotfish
Fish of the Atlantic Ocean
Fish of the Dominican Republic
Fish described in 1801
Taxa named by Marcus Elieser Bloch
Taxa named by Johann Gottlob Theaenus Schneider